Daniel Monzón Jerez (born 1968) is a Spanish film writer and director.

Biography 
He was born in Palma, Majorca in 1968. He started as a film critic, collaborating with the magazine Fotogramas. He also featured alongside  as reviewer in the TVE's film show Días de cine. After taking part in the writing of the 1994 film , he made his debut as feature film director with the film Heart of the Warrior.

He has since directed films such as Celda 211, El Niño, The Kovak Box, Yucatán, and Outlaws.

Awards and nominations

References

External links 
 

Spanish film directors
1968 births
Living people
Best Director Goya Award winners
Spanish film critics
21st-century Spanish screenwriters